The Department of Communications, Information Technology and the Arts (DCITA) was an Australian government department that existed between October 1998 and December 2007. The Department was closed on 3 December 2007 and its authority was transferred to the Department of Broadband, Communications and the Digital Economy.

Scope
While operational, information about the department's functions and government funding allocation originally could be found in the Administrative Arrangements Orders, the annual Portfolio Budget Statements and in the Department's annual reports. At the time of its creation, the Department was responsible for:
Australia's Postal and telecommunications services  
Management of the electromagnetic spectrum 
Broadcasting services 
Management of government records 
Centenary of federation 
Cultural affairs, including support for the arts  
National policy issues relating to the information economy 
Information and communication industries development, electronic commerce and business on-line and Year 2000 issues
Government on-line delivery and information technology and communications management, excluding IT outsourcing

Structure
The Department was an Australian Public Service department, staffed by officials who were responsible to the Minister for Communications, Information Technology and the Arts.

Arrangements for outside participation and public involvement
The Department had an ongoing involvement with the following bodies some of which played a role in consulting with the community and industry:
 Collections Council  of Australia
 Committee on Taxation Incentives for the Arts
 Community Broadcasting Foundation
 Contemporary Music Touring Program Committee
 Cultural Ministers Council (CMC)
 Digital Content Industry  Action Agenda Strategic Industry Leaders Group
 Festivals Australia Committee
 Film Certification Advisory Board
 Media and Communications Council (MACC)
 National Portrait Gallery Board
 Networking the Nation Board
 Online Council
 Online and Communications Council including its Regional Communications and Indigenous Telecommunications Working Groups
 Playing Australia Committee
 Public Lending Right (PLR) Committee
 Sport and Recreation Ministers Council (SR MC)
 Visions of Australia Committee

References

Sources

Ministries established in 1998
Communications, Information Technology and the Arts